Jawbone may refer to:

 Mandible, the lower jaw bone
 Maxilla, the upper jaw bone
 Jawbone (instrument), a musical instrument made from the jawbone of a donkey, horse, or zebra
 Jawbone (musician), blues musician Bob Zabor
 Jawbone (band), an American hardcore punk band
 Jawbone (company), makers of Bluetooth headsets and activity trackers
 Jawbone (film), a 2017 British film
 Jaw Bone, a member of the Fossil Lords from the Gobots franchise
 a sport sunglasses by Oakley, Inc., popularly used by professional race cyclists
 a song by the Band, on their 1969 album The Band
 a term in macroeconomics: jawboning
 in rural British Columbia, and the southern Yukon, Canada, an expression equivalent to credit: "He gave me jawbone" means credit was advanced, usually by a merchant such as the Hudson's Bay Company